Karl Max Håkan Holmgren (born 1 February 1942) is a retired Swedish speed skater. He competed in the 500 m event at the 1968 Winter Olympics and finished eighth.

References

External links
 

1942 births
Living people
Olympic speed skaters of Sweden
Speed skaters at the 1968 Winter Olympics
Swedish male speed skaters
People from Borlänge Municipality
Sportspeople from Dalarna County
20th-century Swedish people